Richard Cletus Pionk (April 26, 1936 - June 5, 2007) was an American artist who worked in the media of pastels and oil painting and who lived, worked and taught in New York City, New York. Pionk studied classical still-life painting by spending hours in museums. He studied still-life painting in the Brooklyn Museum and other New York museums as well as the École du Louvre in Paris. Pionk studied the works of Jean-Baptiste-Siméon Chardin, Antoine Vollon, and Henri Fantin-Latour in particular. He was educated in New York at The Art Students League of New York on scholarships and the G.I. Bill."

Biography
Born in Moose Lake, Minnesota, Pionk studied with Daniel Green and Sidney Dickinson at the Art Students League of New York. In 1984, he was named Master Pastelist by The Pastel Society of America and in 1997 was inducted into the Pastel Hall of Fame. He taught at the Art Students League and was President of the Salmagundi Club. Pionk garnered many awards for his work. He was best known for his still life, portraits and interior scenes in oil and pastel."

Sample of work
Richard C. Pionk, "Grapes and Pears", Oil on Canvas

Memberships
Richard C. Pionk held memberships with the following organizations:
Salmagundi Club
Art Students League
Pastel Society of America - Trustee
Allied Artists of America - Board of Directors
Hudson Valley Art Association
Knickerbocker Art Association
Artist Fellowship – Trustee
National Arts Club
Audubon Artists – Trustee
American Artists Professional League
Dutch Treat Club

Awards
The Pastel Hall of Fame - 1997
Master Pastelist by the Pastel Society of America - 1984

Pastel

Pastel is an art medium in the form of a stick, consisting of pure powdered pigment and a binder. The pigments used in pastels are the same as those used to produce all colored art media, including oil paints; the binder is of a neutral hue and low saturation. The color effect of pastels is closer to the natural dry pigments than that of any other process.

External links
Richard C. Pionk's Official Web Site

References

1936 births
2007 deaths
American still life painters
20th-century American painters
American male painters
21st-century American painters
21st-century American male artists
People from Moose Lake, Minnesota
Painters from New York City
Painters from Minnesota
Pastel artists
Art Students League of New York alumni
Art Students League of New York faculty
Members of the Salmagundi Club
20th-century American male artists